Telesarchus or Telesarch (Telesarkhos) is a little-attested Greek author who wrote a work on the early history of Argolis, called the Argolicum or Argolica. He is mentioned by Sextus Empiricus and scholia on Homer and on Euripides' Alcestis. The availability of his writings was limited even among the Romans.

References

Ancient Argolis
Ancient Greek historians known only from secondary sources